The 1977 Delaware Fightin' Blue Hens football team represented the University of Delaware as an independent during the 1977 NCAA Division II football season. They were led by Tubby Raymond, who was in his 12th season as head coach of the Fightin' Blue Hens. The team played its home games at Delaware Stadium in Newark, Delaware. The Hens missed the playoffs, finishing the season with a record of 6–3–1.

Schedule

Roster

References

Delaware
Delaware Fightin' Blue Hens football seasons
Delaware Fightin' Blue Hens football